Daniel Boyle may refer to:

Daniel Boyle (politician) (1859–1925), Irish politician, MP for North Mayo
Daniel Boyle (writer), Scottish screenwriter
Dan Boyle (ice hockey) (born 1976), Canadian ice hockey player
Dan Boyle (politician) (born 1962), Irish Green Party politician
Danny Boyle (born 1956), British director and filmmaker

See also

Daniel Doyle (disambiguation)
Danny Boy (disambiguation)
Daniel (disambiguation)
Boyle (disambiguation)